Witzands Aquifer Nature Reserve is a  protected natural area in Cape Town, South Africa, located on the city’s northern outskirts. This reserve protects an important part of Cape Town’s natural and cultural heritage, including the Atlantis Aquifer.

Biodiversity
The conservation area consists of two priority nature sites, the Silwerstroomstrand Conservation Area and the Atlantis Dunefields. They protect a patch of Atlantis Sand Fynbos vegetation type, as well as Cape Flats Dune Strandveld. Both vegetation types are endangered. The local landscape consists of sandy beaches, rocky shorelines and outcrops, as well as mobile dunes. Among the many animals that can be found in this reserve is the globally threatened black harrier, the caracal, the steenbok, the Cape grysbok and a variety of other mammals, birds, reptiles and amphibians.

Recreation
The conservation area is host to various recreational activities, including sand-boarding, camping and whale watching, and the reserve is also used for film shoots, quad biking and picnics.
Read More

See also
 Biodiversity of Cape Town
 List of nature reserves in Cape Town
 Atlantis Sand Fynbos
 Cape Flats Dune Strandveld
 Atlantis Dunes

References

 
Nature reserves in Cape Town
Protected areas of the Western Cape